The 1964–65 NBA season was the Warriors' 19th season in the NBA and 3rd in the San Francisco Bay Area.

Offseason

Roster

Regular season

Season standings

x – clinched playoff spot

Record vs. opponents

Game log

Awards and records
 Wilt Chamberlain, NBA All-Star Game
 Nate Thurmond, NBA All-Star Game

References

Golden State Warriors seasons
San Francisco
San Fran
San Fran